Ufford Hall may refer to the following buildings in England:

 Ufford Hall, Cambridgeshire
 Ufford Hall, Suffolk